Aerenicopsis virgata is a species of beetle in the family Cerambycidae. It was described by Francis Polkinghorne Pascoe in 1878.

References

Aerenicini
Beetles described in 1878
Taxa named by Francis Polkinghorne Pascoe